Leif Andersen  (26 February 1936 – 21 November 2014) was a Norwegian competition rower. He competed in the 1952 Summer Olympics.

References

External links

1936 births
2014 deaths 
Sportspeople from Bærum
Norwegian male rowers
Olympic rowers of Norway
Rowers at the 1952 Summer Olympics